Ilex wugonshanensis is a species of plant in the family Aquifoliaceae. It is endemic to China.

References

wugonshanensis
Endemic flora of China
Endangered flora of Asia
Taxonomy articles created by Polbot